Sheila Kanungo  is an Indian sport shooter. She won a silver medal in 2002 Commonwealth Games in Air Pistol Pairs.

References 

Year of birth missing (living people)
Living people
Commonwealth Games medallists in shooting
Commonwealth Games silver medallists for India
Shooters at the 2002 Commonwealth Games
Indian female sport shooters
Shooters at the 2002 Asian Games
Medallists at the 2002 Commonwealth Games